Frederick Victor Dickins  (24 May 1838 – 16 August 1915) was a British naval surgeon, barrister, orientalist and university administrator. He is now remembered as a translator of Japanese literature.

Life
Dickins was born at 44 Connaught Terrace in Paddington, London to Thomas Dickins and Jane Dickins. He first visited Japan as a medical officer on HMS Coromandel in 1863. For three years he was at Yokohama in charge of medical facilities there. During this time he was in contact with Japanese doctors and culture, and also Ernest Satow who became a lifelong correspondent and friend.  He began publishing English translations of Japanese classical works at this time. He left his naval position, returned to England and tried some career choices, but came back to Japan in 1871, having in the meantime married and been called to the Bar. He built up a legal practice in Japan. In the Maria Luz jurisdiction case he represented the Peruvian captain of the ship. He was also widely involved with the Yokohama community, with botany, and journalism.

Dickins was especially interested in ferns which he collected at Yokohama and Atami, 1863–65. He sent both living plants and drawings back to Joseph Dalton Hooker at the Royal Botanic Gardens at Kew.

He returned to England in 1879. After spending some further time practising law in Egypt, he mostly devoted himself to Japanese studies and administration in the University of London. He was appointed CB in the 1901 New Year Honours.

Works

The Collected Works of Frederick Victor Dickins (Bristol: Ganesha, Tokyo: Edition Synapse 1999) reprinted in seven volumes with an introduction by Peter Kornicki 
 Dickins co-authored a Life of Sir Harry Parkes with Stanley Lane-Poole. Lane-Poole wrote the first volume on Parkes in China, Dickins the second volume on Parkes in Japan.

Letters to Dickins

Sir Ernest Satow's Private Letters to W.G. Aston and F.V. Dickins edited by Ian Ruxton with an introduction by Peter Kornicki, Lulu Press Inc, February 2008

Honours
In 1885, French botanist Adrien René Franchet in Nouv. Arch. Mus. Hist. Nat., séries 2, Vol.8 on page 244 published and described a plant from China. 
He named the genus, Dickinsia in honour of Frederick Dickins.

References

External links
Biography

1838 births
1915 deaths
British orientalists
British Japanologists
British barristers
British surgeons
Companions of the Order of the Bath
Royal Navy Medical Service officers
19th-century British translators
People from Paddington